Matsulu is a township in the Mbombela Local Municipality under the Ehlanzeni District Municipality in the Mpumalanga province of South Africa. It lies next to the N4 national road 41 km east of Nelspruit (Mbombela) CBD, 3 km before the Kaapmuiden train station.

The township is divided into three sections: Matsulu A, Matsulu B and Matsulu C.

History

The township was established in the 1970s. Its existence came to be when African natives were forcefully removed from the nearby lands to form sugarcane plantations then relocated to the land which now forms Matsulu Township. It is alleged that the area was named after a resident who had informally settled there prior to the forced allocation; the name of the resident was Matsulu. 

From the 1970s to 1994 the township was administrated by the now defunct KaNgwane District Bantustan. It played a major role as an official residency for Members of Parliament (KaNgwane District Bantustan).

Like many South African townships, Matsulu was embroiled in Apartheid-era violence during the 1980s and the early '90s. In 1994 the administration of the township was handed over to the then Greater Nelspruit City Council, ending the Bantustan administration.

Post 1994

Matsulu was re-organised and municipal wards were allocated to streamline it with the rest of the City Council (now called Mbombela Municipality).

Economy

The township's economy is heavily dependent on its mother city Mbombela, where most of its employed skilled and semiskilled residents work. The township's economy itself is largely informal. A few hundred find employment in primary economy sectors like brick manufacturing and bricklaying, while some people are also employed on the nearby fruit farms as seasonal workers.

Corner shops known as spaza shops are found scattered throughout the area which are often owned and operated by foreigners like Somali, Ethiopian and Pakistani immigrants on leased residential sites.

There is two (2) formal shopping complexes with a dozen shops anchored by the Spar and Boxer retailer. However, there is no dedicated CBD, nor industrial site, so many businesses operate unregulated at random locations with little municipal control.

Educational Institutions

Public education institutions in Matsulu:

Primary Schools

Benjamin Primary School  
Enzani Primary School
Funindlela Primary School
Lethakuthula Primary School
Matsulu Primary School
Phumalanga Primary School
Sehlulile Primary School
Sibongile Primary School
Sukumani Primary School
Takheleni Primary School
Tsandzanani Primary School
 
High Schools

Tikhontele Secondary School
Sibusisiwe Secondary School
Masitakhe Secondary School
Sitfokotile Secondary School

Tertiary

Matsulu TVET Skills Academy

Transportation

Ways to get in-and-around Matsulu while using public transportation:

Minibus taxis, which operate on a short-range distance from Matsulu to Nelspruit (Mbombela), Malelane and back.
Buscor buses, which operate on a medium distance from Matsulu to Nelspruit (Mbombela), Malelane, Barberton and back.
 Local taxis/private cars, which only operate in and around Matsulu, serving the three sections of the township. These local taxis take the form of Toyota Avanzas and they transport locals on tarred/paved roads, ignoring the gravel.
Air, utilising the Kruger Mpumalanga International Airport  with flights from major cities in Southern Africa, Matsulu is 40 km east of the airport.
Railway utilising the Kaapmuiden train station which is 3 km outside Matsulu. It should be of note that the train arrives only once a day at around 18h00 local time coming from Johannesburg.

Gallery

Climate

Matsulu has a subtropical climate with very warm humid summers and cool dry winters.

Nearby Places of Interest

Tourist attractions within a 150 km radius:

Kruger National Park 
Mthethomusha Game Reserve 
Sudwala Caves

Notable People

Eric Kholwane, former Mpumalanga MEC for Finance, Economic Development and Tourism

References

Populated places in the Mbombela Local Municipality
Townships in Mpumalanga